Michihisa (written: 倫央 or 道久) is a masculine Japanese given name. Notable people with the name include:

 (born 1966), Japanese footballer
Michihisa Nagasawa, (born 1989), Japanese former footballer
, Japanese samurai
Michihisa Onoda, (born 1978) Japanese tennis player

Japanese masculine given names